Shraddha Kapoor (born 3 March 1987 or 1989) is an Indian actress who primarily works in Hindi films. One of India's highest-paid actresses, Kapoor has been featured in Forbes India Celebrity 100 list since 2014 and was featured by Forbes Asia in their 30 Under 30 list of 2016. 

The daughter of actor Shakti Kapoor, she began her acting career with a brief role in the 2010 heist film Teen Patti, and followed it with her first leading role in the teen drama Luv Ka The End (2011). Kapoor had her breakthrough for playing a singer in the commercially successful romantic musical Aashiqui 2 (2013), for which she received a nomination for the Filmfare Award for Best Actress. The following year, she portrayed a character based on Ophelia in Vishal Bhardwaj's highly acclaimed ensemble drama Haider (2014). Kapoor established herself with starring roles in the romantic thriller Ek Villain (2014), the dance drama ABCD 2 (2015) and the action film Baaghi (2016). Following a series of poorly-received films, her highest-grossing releases came with the horror comedy Stree (2018), the action thriller Saaho (2019), and the comedy-drama Chhichhore (2019).

In addition to acting in films, Kapoor has sung several of her film songs. She is the celebrity endorser for several brands and products, in 2015, she launched her own line of clothing.

Early life and background 

Kapoor was born and raised in Mumbai. On her father's side, Kapoor is of Punjabi descent, and on her mother's side, she is of Marathi and Konkani ancestry. Her maternal grandfather Pandharinath Kolhapure, (the nephew of Deenanath Mangeshkar) belonged from Kolhapur and her maternal grandmother hailed from Panaji, Goa. In an interview with The Hindustan Times, Kapoor revealed that, she was raised as a in a Marathi cultural setting as her maternal relatives lived in Maharashtra. She has said that she went through a tomboyish phase as a child and described herself as having a strong attitude, because of which she was deliberately picking fights with boys.

Kapoor's family members include her father Shakti Kapoor and mother Shivangi Kapoor, her elder brother Siddhanth Kapoor, her two aunts Padmini Kolhapure and Tejaswini Kolhapure are all actors in Indian Cinema. She is the great-niece of Lata Mangeshkar, Asha Bhosle, Meena Khadikar, Usha Mangeshkar and Hridaynath Mangeshkar. Hailing from a family of actors, Kapoor desired to become an actress since a young age. Wearing her parents' clothes, she used to rehearse film dialogues and dance to Bollywood songs in front of the mirror. She also accompanied her father to various shooting locations in her childhood. During one of David Dhawan's shoots, Kapoor befriended actor Varun Dhawan, to play with him, and they were holding a torch pretending it to be a camera while delivering film lines to each other, and they were also dancing to Govinda's film songs.

Kapoor did her schooling at Jamnabai Narsee School and at the age of 15, she shifted to the American School of Bombay. In an interview with The Times of India, Shetty revealed that they all used to participate in dance competitions. Believing herself to be competitive at the age of 17, Kapoor played soccer and handball as she thought these games were challenging. When interviewed by The Hindustan Times in 2016, both Kapoor and Shroff admitted that they had a crush on each other in school, but never proposed to each other.

Kapoor then enrolled in Boston University to major in psychology, but she left in her freshman year to appear in her debut film after she was seen on Facebook by producer Ambika Hinduja, who cast her for a role in Teen Patti. In an interview with Filmfare, Shakti Kapoor revealed that Kapoor was barely 16 years old when she was offered her first film, Lucky: No Time for Love (2005) by Salman Khan, after he saw one of her school play performances, but she rejected the proposal as she was aspiring to become a psychologist. Kapoor was trained as a singer since her childhood as her maternal grandfather and mother are classical singers.

Career

Career struggles and breakthrough (2010–2016) 

Kapoor made her acting debut in the 2010 thriller Teen Patti, alongside Amitabh Bachchan, Ben Kingsley and R. Madhavan. She played the role of a college girl. The film received generally negative reviews, though her performance was better received. Preeti Arora, writing for Rediff.com stated that: "though a bit raw, she has a lot of potential." Nikhat Kazmi reviewed: "Shraddha Kapoor makes an interesting debut as the edgy youngster who sheds her specs for sleaze, with alacrity." The film failed to do well at the box office; however Kapoor's performance earned her a nomination for the Filmfare Award for Best Female Debut. After her debut, she signed a three-film deal with Yash Raj Films and featured in their 2011 teen comedy Luv Ka The End, with Taaha Shah. Kapoor portrayed the lead role of a teenage student who plots against her boyfriend after he cheats on her. The film underperformed at the box office and received mixed reviews from critics. However, Kapoor's performance received positive critical reviews. Taran Adarsh wrote: "Shraddha is a revelation, catching you unaware with a confident performance. She's electrifying in the sequence when she breaks down after getting to know the true intentions of her lover." For her performance, Kapoor received the Stardust Searchlight Award for Best Actress. Kapoor was subsequently offered the lead female role in Aurangzeb (2013) as a part of her deal with Yash Raj Films. However, she signed on to Vishesh Films' Aashiqui 2 (2013) instead, thereby cancelling the three-film contract with Yash Raj Films.

In 2013, Kapoor found her breakthrough role in Mohit Suri's romantic musical Aashiqui 2, the sequel to the 1990 film Aashiqui. She was cast as Aarohi Keshav Shirke, a small-town bar singer who becomes a successful playback artist with the help of a popular male singer (played by Aditya Roy Kapur). Film critic Anupama Chopra called Kapoor a "real triumph" and added that her "porcelain face has a haunting vulnerability." However, Vinayak Chakravorty of India Today wrote that she "looks pretty though fails to add spark." Kapoor received several nominations in the Best Actress category, including her first at the Filmfare Awards. The same year, she also appeared in a guest appearance for the romantic comedy Gori Tere Pyaar Mein, playing the fiancée of Imran Khan's character.

Kapoor next reunited with Suri for the romantic thriller Ek Villain (2014), in which she also made her singing debut with the song "Galliyan". The film tells the story of a hardened criminal (played by Sidharth Malhotra) whose terminally-ill wife (played by Kapoor) is brutally murdered by a serial killer (played by Riteish Deshmukh). The film was generally perceived to be plagiarised from the Korean film I Saw the Devil (2010), although Suri claimed that it was an original film. In her review, Raedita Tandon of Filmfare called the film a "gritty, engaging thriller", and stated that Kapoor was a revelation in it. Her second release that year was Vishal Bhardwaj's highly acclaimed ensemble drama Haider, an adaptation of William Shakespeare's Hamlet, set during the Kashmir conflict of 1995. She played the Ophelia-based character, a journalist named Arshia, opposite Shahid Kapoor and Tabu. Writing for Deccan Chronicle, critic Kusumita Das praised Kapoor's effort in capturing the varied nuances of her character and noted that her portrayal was "surprisingly composed". Also that year, Kapoor performed an item number "Dance Basanti" in the Karan Johar-produced thriller Ungli.

In 2015, Kapoor starred in a sequel to the dance film ABCD: Any Body Can Dance (2013), entitled ABCD 2, she portrayed the role of  Vinita Sharma, a hip-hop dancer who competes in an international hip-hop competition alongside her childhood friend Suresh Mukund (essayed by Varun Dhawan). In preparation for her role, she learned different genres of dance form from choreographers Prabhudeva and Remo D'Souza. Produced by Walt Disney Pictures, the film earned  worldwide to become her most widely-seen film to that point. 
Kapoor began 2016 by featuring as star Tiger Shroff's love interest in the action film Baaghi, about a pair of rebellious lovers set against the backdrop of a martial arts school. The role required her to practice Kalaripayattu (a martial art originating in the south of India). Shubhra Gupta of The Indian Express considered her character in it to be dated, but thought that she played the romantic and action sequences "well enough".

Career struggles (2016–2017) 
Kapoor's final release in 2016 was the rock musical drama Rock On 2, a sequel to 2008's Rock On!!. She was cast alongside Farhan Akhtar, Arjun Rampal and Prachi Desai. She played the role of Jiah Sharma, an introverted singer and keyboard player, who suffers a neglectful relationship with her father. To prepare, she spent time reading books in isolation and undertook vocal training under the singer Samantha Edwards. Namrata Joshi of The Hindu disliked the film and considered Kapoor's performance "self-consciously meek and submissive". Rock On 2 did not recoup its  investment, thus emerging as a commercial failure at the box office.

In 2017, Kapoor starred in Shaad Ali's romantic comedy Ok Jaanu, in her second collaboration with Aditya Roy Kapur. A remake of Mani Ratnam's Tamil romantic drama O Kadhal Kanmani (2015), the film was produced by Karan Johar under the banner of Dharma Productions. Kapoor next appeared in the romance Half Girlfriend, in which she was paired opposite Arjun Kapoor. It was based on Chetan Bhagat's novel of the same name, and reunited her with director Mohit Suri. In a review of the latter film, Raja Sen of NDTV considered it to be a "preposterously dimwitted romance" and criticised Kapoor as "shrill and insubstantial". Later in 2017, Kapoor appeared in Apoorva Lakhia's Haseena Parkar, a biopic of terrorist Dawood Ibrahim's sister, who ran a crime ring of her own. Kapoor played the titular role, alongside her brother Siddhanth Kapoor, who essayed Ibrahim's character. The film met with negative reviews upon release; Anna M. M. Vetticad of Firstpost considered Kapoor's performance to be as "bland as the screenplay", adding that "she tries to appear mature and menacing, but the effort shows too much". None of her 2017 releases performed well at the box office.

Commercial success (2018–present) 

Kapoor next starred opposite Rajkummar Rao in the horror comedy Stree (2018). Based on the legend of Nale Ba, the film featured her as a mysterious, unnamed woman who falls in love with Rao's character. The critic Saibal Chatterjee took note of the film's feminist subtext and found Kapoor to be "suitably icy as the enigmatic woman". Rajeev Masand opined that she "blends in nicely as the alluring out-of-towner with an air of mystery around her".
In the same year, Kapoor reteamed with Shahid Kapoor in Batti Gul Meter Chalu, a social problem film about electricity issues in rural India. She agreed to the project due to the social message she found in the script. Filming was marred with dispute when the studio KriArj Entertainment failed to remunerate the crew. Following a brief hiatus, production resumed after Bhushan Kumar took over the project. Writing for India Today, Charu Thakur noted that Kapoor "needs to go a long way as far as her acting skills are concerned".

Kapoor was committed to star in a biopic of badminton player Saina Nehwal, directed by Amole Gupte, but after filming for a few days she opted out of the project citing a scheduling conflict. She began 2019 by playing the leading lady opposite Prabhas in Sujeeth's action film Saaho. Kapoor shot her portions in Telugu and Hindi languages. In a scathing review for Mid-Day, Mayank Shekhar dismissed her part as "rather pale and pointless". The Telugu version of the film did not perform well, but its Hindi version was a commercial success. Her next film release was Nitesh Tiwari's Chhichhore, a comedy-drama about college life, co-starring Sushant Singh Rajput. Udita Jhunjhunwala of Mint labelled it a "lively homage to hostel life" and added that "in spite of a sketchy role, Kapoor delivers a moving and likeable performance".

Kapoor began the new decade by reuniting with Dhawan in the dance film Street Dancer 3D (2020), which Namrata Joshi termed a "compilation of indistinguishable performances". It did not perform well commercially. She then reteamed with Shroff in the spiritual sequel Baaghi 3. It underperformed commercially as theatres were shut due to the COVID-19 pandemic.

After a three-year hiatus, which she described as "“unforeseen and forced” due to the pandemic, Kapoor starred alongside Ranbir Kapoor in Luv Ranjan's romantic comedy Tu Jhoothi Main Makkaar (2023).

Other work and media image 

In addition to acting in films, Kapoor has supported charitable organisations, performed for stage shows and sang in her films. She has also ramp walked in the Lakme Fashion Week for various fashion designers and has been the cover model for several magazines. Kapoor is the brand ambassador of several products, including Lakmé, Veet, Lipton, Marico's Hair & Care and many others. Bollywood Hungama named her "one of the most wanted names" in the advertising industry. Later, in March 2015, she launched her own line of clothing for women, named Imara, in association with Amazon.com. In 2021, she invested in the beverage brand Shunya.

Kapoor has established herself as one of the most popular celebrities in India. In 2013, a poll conducted by the Indian edition of FHM ranked her fifth in their listing of the world's sexiest actresses. In 2014, she was placed at the sixth position and the following year she was placed at the second position in McAfee's most-searched celebrities poll. Google Trends also noted that Kapoor is one of the most-searched Indian actresses between 2014 and 2015. Rediff.com placed her in their listing of the top 10 Bollywood actresses in 2014. Kapoor was placed seventh on The Times of Indias listing of the Most Desirable Women in 2014 and 2015. In 2015, the Indian edition of the International Business Times press positioned her fourth among the top actresses and Rediff.com featured her among the top earners.

In 2016, Forbes magazine featured her as one of the most successful Asians under the age of 30 and the previous year, the Indian edition of the magazine featured her in their annual Celebrity 100 list with a total earning of US$1.3 million per year. The same year, she became the third most followed Indian actress on Instagram with a total number of over 10 million followers. Kapoor has also gained recognition for her dressing sense. Various media outlets have praised her sense of style, and has been considered for ramp walks by several fashion designers. In 2018, Eastern Eye featured her as one of the eight sexiest women in Bollywood. In 2020, Kapoor became the third most followed Indian celebrity on Instagram and she was named the Hottest Vegetarian by Peta India. In 2021, Shraddha was featured in a documentary titled Tails of Boo Boo & Cuddly Poo that highlighted the plight of stray animals.

Filmography

Films

Music video

Discography

Accolades

References

External links 

 



1987 births
Living people
Indian film actresses
Singers from Mumbai
Marathi people
Actresses in Hindi cinema
Actresses from Mumbai
Female models from Mumbai
Punjabi people
21st-century Indian actresses
Screen Awards winners
Indian Hindus